Uğur Demirok (born 8 July 1988 in Eyüp, Istanbul, Turkey) is a Turkish footballer who plays as a defender for Süper Lig club Kayserispor. 

Demirok earned his first cap for Turkey in a friendly match against Sweden on 5 March 2014.

Honours
Galatasaray
Süper Lig: 2005–06

References

External links
 

1988 births
Living people
People from Eyüp
Turkish footballers
Süper Lig players
Galatasaray A2 footballers
Galatasaray S.K. footballers
Gaziantepspor footballers
İstanbulspor footballers
Beylerbeyi S.K. footballers
Kartalspor footballers
Akhisarspor footballers
Footballers from Istanbul
Turkey youth international footballers
Turkey international footballers
Trabzonspor footballers

Association football defenders